Jabri railway station is a small railway station in Shajapur district, Madhya Pradesh. Its code is JBX. It serves Jabadiya Bheel village. The station consists of two platforms, neither well sheltered. It lacks many facilities including water and sanitation.

Bombing of Jabri railway station 

On 7 March 2017, terrorists who were known to authorities to be radicalized by ISIS planted low intensity explosives in the Bhopal–Ujjain Passenger train at the Jabri railway station, injuring ten passengers. It was the first-ever strike in India by the so-called Islamic State.

Major trains 
 Bhopal–Indore Fast Passenger
 Bhopal–Ujjain Passenger
 Habibganj–Dahod Fast Passenger
 Ujjain–Bhopal passenger

See also 
 2017 Bhopal–Ujjain Passenger train bombing

References

Railway stations in Shajapur district
Ratlam railway division